Heinz Patzig (born 19 September 1929 in Chemnitz; died 28 March 2013 in Braunschweig) aged 83 years-old, was a German footballer and manager.

Career

Early in his career Patzig played for Fewa Chemnitz (a predecessor club of Chemnitzer FC) in East Germany. In 1950 Patzig fled into West Germany and went on to play successfully for Oberliga Nord sides VfB Lübeck and Eintracht Braunschweig, until an injury forced him to retire in 1961.

Coaching career

After his playing career, Patzing worked as Eintracht Braunschweig's assistant coach for 27 straight seasons, from 1963 to 1991, under managers such as Helmuth Johannsen, Otto Knefler, Branko Zebec, Uli Maslo, Aleksandar Ristić, and others. The biggest success during his time as an assistant came in 1967, when Eintracht won the Bundesliga. Four times Patzig took over as caretaker manager: in 1979, 1983, 1985, and 1986. In total, he was the team's head coach for 15 Bundesliga and 13 2. Bundesliga games.

References

External links

1929 births
2013 deaths
Sportspeople from Chemnitz
Footballers from Saxony
German footballers
East German footballers
German football managers
Bundesliga managers
2. Bundesliga managers
Eintracht Braunschweig players
Eintracht Braunschweig managers
Eintracht Braunschweig non-playing staff
VfB Lübeck players
Chemnitzer FC players
Association football forwards